Francisco Tomás de Anchia Longa (10 April 1783 – 1831) was a Spanish general.

Biography 
He was born in the village of Longa, Mallabia (province of Biscay). A blacksmith by trade, he and 100 men engaged the French in guerrilla warfare, attacking the lines of communication around Pancorbo, Orduña and Valdeajos. From these humble beginnings, he subsequently became the commander of the Iberian Division. In 1813 he was appointed General, later Field Marshal and in 1825, Lieutenant-General.  He died in 1831 at 48 years of age.

Francisco Anchia y Urquiza (10 April 1783 – 1831) became known as Francisco de Longa because of his leadership of that village and surrounding area. He was born in Spain in the Biscay province of Longa, Mallabia and was a blacksmith before the war. Longa was first a Spanish guerrilla in 1809 with a few followers. These partidas, or groups, were encouraged by the military and civil authorities. Part of the reason for this was logistical: the bands depended upon supplies from the regular forces including arms and ammunitions. Longa’s partidas attacked lines of communications. Then he formed a battalion of 700 men by 1811 as lieutenant colonel, and he ascended to the command of the Iberian Division by 1812 as colonel. He and his forces fought in the Cantabrian mountains for four years and were familiar with the terrain, which served Wellington’s campaign well. He became commander of the Spanish Fourth Army, was made a brigadier general by 1814, lieutenant general by 1815, and then later a field marshal. Longa supported Wellington’s Anglo-Portuguese campaign of 1813. At the Battle of Vitoria, Longa’s division was part of Sir Thomas Graham’s column that ran through the mountains that were to the north. Their mission was designed to prevent the French forces from retreating east from Vitoria and they were directed to not be decisively engaged before the other columns. They faced the French Army of Portugal that had the mission of protecting the French lines of communication. They fought in the eastern area of Gammarra Mayor and sustained the highest casualties; it was named “Gomorrah” because of the nature of devastation of the battle. Longa’s forces were able to cut the main French retreat route. Longa’s support aided the allied forces under Wellington to victory. Longa’s guerilla forces were able to aide in depriving the French forces from intelligence and instead provide intelligence of French locations to Wellington’s allied forces. Longa also achieved disruption: French internal coordination and logistics were hampered, negatively affecting both the discipline and morale of the French forces. The major achievements of the Battle of Vitoria were a greater French casualty rate than the allied forces (approximately 8,000 to 5,000 respectively) and capture of 151 of 153 French cannons and 415 French caissons (ammunition chests). Some argue that without forces like Longa’s guerillas, the French forces would not have been defeated. Within the next month, most French forces left Spain and French rule was practically ended.

References

 Website for the book De Guerrillero a General (From Guerrillero to General)

External links
 Guerrillas in the mists of time

Spanish soldiers
Spanish generals
Spanish commanders of the Napoleonic Wars
1783 births
1842 deaths
Spanish guerrillas